Nikola Peshev was the first Mayor of Kumanovo, Socialist Republic of Macedonia.

See also
List of mayors of Kumanovo

References

People from Kumanovo
Yugoslav communists
Macedonian communists